Walter Hill (born 1942) is an American film director.

Walter Hill may also refer to:

People 

 Walter Hill (garden curator) (1820–1904), Scottish-born Australian botanist, founder of Brisbane Botanic Gardens
 Walter A. Hill (born 1946), American agricultural scientist
 Walter Barnard Hill (1851–1905), American lawyer, Chancellor of the University of Georgia 1889–1905
 Walter Hill (footballer) (before 1891–after 1899), English footballer
 Walter Hill (British Army officer) (1877–1942), British soldier, Colonel of the Royal Fusiliers
 Walter Hill (sportscaster) (1928–2014), American sportscaster
 Walter Hill (serial killer) (1935–1997), American serial killer executed in Alabama
 Walter Newell Hill (1889–1955), American Medal of Honor recipient
 Walter Hill Jr., scholar, historian and archivist

Places 

 Walter Hill, Queensland, a locality in the Cassowary Coast Region, Australia
 Walterhill, Tennessee, census-designated place in Rutherford County, Tennessee

Other uses 

Filmworks II: Music for an Untitled Film by Walter Hill, an album of music by John Zorn not used in the movie Trespass
 
Hill (surname)